Overseas Chinese University (OCU) is a private university in Xitun District, Taichung, Taiwan. It was founded in 1964 by the Hsin Tien Kong Educational Foundation, and was originally called the Overseas Chinese Junior College. 

OCU offers a range of undergraduate and graduate programs in various fields, including management, computer science, engineering, design, law, and health sciences.

History
OCU was founded in 1964.

Academic Units
 School of Business and Management
 School of Information Technology and Design
 School of Tourism and Hospitality

Faculty
OCU faculty members are made up of 350 instructors and professors in total. Among them, 240 are full-time.

Students
OCU enrolled about 10,000 students.

See also
 List of universities in Taiwan

References

External links

 

1964 establishments in Taiwan
Educational institutions established in 1964
Universities and colleges in Taichung